Eaux profondes is a 1981 French thriller film directed by Michel Deville that stars Isabelle Huppert and Jean-Louis Trintignant. Based on the novel Deep Water by Patricia Highsmith, it tells the story of a man who regains his wife's affections by killing two of her lovers.

Plot
On the island of Jersey, the perfumier Vic and his wife Mélanie are an ideal couple. Living in a grand house, they entertain often and mix with all the important people. Mélanie has however taken to provoking Vic at parties by flirting outrageously with other men, so Vic warns them off by saying that he was the murderer of a missing man. 

Mélanie then starts bringing random men home to drink and dance with her, until Vic eventually goes to bed alone in disgust. When she picks up Carlo, a hotel employee, and takes him to an exclusive party, Vic has had enough. After everybody has had a dip in the swimming pool, just Carlo is left and Vic drowns him. The verdict of the inquest is accidental death, though Mélanie claims at the hearing that it was murder by Vic. When soon after she brings home yet another lover, this time Vic researches the man, finding that he is a private investigator hired by Mélanie to keep an eye on him. When the man's cover is blown, he leaves fast. 

Vic then receives a visitor, a man named Cameron who sells perfumes in the USA, and Mélanie makes an immediate play for him. After she tells Vic one morning that she is leaving with Cameron, driving into town he sees the man and asks him into the car to discuss things. Going to an isolated spot, after bludgeoning Cameron to death and wrapping and trussing the body, he tips it off a high cliff into the sea. Investigating the unexplained disappearance of a man who had not paid his hotel bill, the police question Vic as the last person to see him and then close the file for lack of evidence. Mélanie now realises that he has killed two men to get closer to her and starts a reconciliation.

Cast
 Isabelle Huppert as Mélanie
 Jean-Louis Trintignant as Vic
 Sandrine Kljajic as their daughter Marion
 Éric Frey as Denis Miller
 Christian Benedetti as Carlo Canelli
 Bruce Myers as Cameron
 Bertrand Bonvoisin as Robert Carpentier
 Jean-Luc Moreau as Joël
 Robin Renucci as Ralph
 Philippe Clévenot as Henri Valette
 Martine Costes as La maman de Julie
 Évelyne Didi as Evelyn Cowan
 Jean-Michel Dupuis as Philip Cowan
 Bernard Freyd as Havermal
 Anne Head as La directrice
 Maurice Jacquemont as Docteur Franklin
 Sylvie Orcier as Jeanne Miller
 Pierre Vial as Le juge

See also
 Deep Water (2022)
 List of Isabelle Huppert performances

References

External links

1981 films
1980s psychological thriller films
1980s French-language films
French psychological thriller films
Police detective films
Films based on American novels
Films based on works by Patricia Highsmith
Films directed by Michel Deville
Gaumont Film Company films
1980s French films